The 1997–98 Pittsburgh Penguins season was the team's 31st in the National Hockey League (NHL). It was their first season under Head Coach Kevin Constantine and first after the initial retirement of Mario Lemieux.

Offseason 
Following the 1996–97 season which saw their Hall of Fame star Mario Lemieux retire, the Penguins attempted to continue keeping their recent success. Over the previous nine seasons, no NHL team had been more successful than Pittsburgh in terms of regular season points, although the team had not won a Stanley Cup since 1992 (part of the reason why Head Coach Eddie Johnston was asked to resign down following the 1996–97 season). Former San Jose Sharks Head Coach Kevin Constantine was hired as Johnston's successor, promising to replace his predecessor's free-form style of play with a more disciplined approach. Additionally, Ron Francis was named captain in Lemieux's absence, and the team acquired center Martin Straka via free agency to add offense. The team also acquired the rights to defensive-defenseman Jiri Slegr, who had spent the 1996–97 season playing for Sodertalje SK in Sweden.

Regular season 
The Penguins tied the Chicago Blackhawks, Florida Panthers and New York Islanders for most short-handed goals allowed, with 16.

Final standings

Schedule and results 

|-  style="background:#ffc;"
| 1 || 1 || Los Angeles Kings || 3–3 || Pittsburgh Penguins || 0–0–1 || 1
|-  style="background:#cfc;"
| 2 || 3 || Pittsburgh Penguins || 4–3 || Carolina Hurricanes || 1–0–1 || 3
|-  style="background:#fcf;"
| 3 || 4 || Florida Panthers || 5–3 || Pittsburgh Penguins || 1–1–1 || 3
|-  style="background:#fcf;"
| 4 || 8 || Montreal Canadiens || 3–0 || Pittsburgh Penguins || 1–2–1 || 3
|-  style="background:#fcf;"
| 5 || 9 || Pittsburgh Penguins || 1–3 || Philadelphia Flyers || 1–3–1 || 3
|-  style="background:#cfc;"
| 6 || 11 || Carolina Hurricanes || 1–4 || Pittsburgh Penguins || 2–3–1 || 5
|-  style="background:#cfc;"
| 7 || 14 || Pittsburgh Penguins || 1–0 || New York Rangers || 3–3–1 || 7
|-  style="background:#ffc;"
| 8 || 15 || Pittsburgh Penguins || 1–1 || Montreal Canadiens || 3–3–2 || 8
|-  style="background:#cfc;"
| 9 || 17 || Pittsburgh Penguins || 4–1 || Tampa Bay Lightning || 4–3–2 || 10
|-  style="background:#cfc;"
| 10 || 19 || Pittsburgh Penguins || 4–1 || Florida Panthers || 5–3–2 || 12
|-  style="background:#cfc;"
| 11 || 22 || Pittsburgh Penguins || 5–2 || San Jose Sharks || 6–3–2 || 14
|-  style="background:#fcf;"
| 12 || 24 || Pittsburgh Penguins || 3–4 || Edmonton Oilers || 6–4–2 || 14
|-  style="background:#cfc;"
| 13 || 25 || Pittsburgh Penguins || 3–2 OT || Vancouver Canucks || 7–4–2 || 16
|-  style="background:#fcf;"
| 14 || 28 || Pittsburgh Penguins || 3–6 || Calgary Flames || 7–5–2 || 16
|-

|-  style="background:#cfc;"
| 15 || 1 || Vancouver Canucks || 6–7 OT || Pittsburgh Penguins || 8–5–2 || 18
|-  style="background:#fcf;"
| 16 || 2 || Pittsburgh Penguins || 1–3 || Chicago Blackhawks || 8–6–2 || 18
|-  style="background:#fcf;"
| 17 || 5 || Dallas Stars || 5–2 || Pittsburgh Penguins || 8–7–2 || 18
|-  style="background:#ffc;"
| 18 || 7 || Pittsburgh Penguins || 1–1 || Detroit Red Wings || 8–7–3 || 19
|-  style="background:#ffc;"
| 19 || 8 || Buffalo Sabres || 2–2 || Pittsburgh Penguins || 8–7–4 || 20
|-  style="background:#fcf;"
| 20 || 12 || Washington Capitals || 4–1 || Pittsburgh Penguins || 8–8–4 || 20
|-  style="background:#fcf;"
| 21 || 14 || Pittsburgh Penguins || 1–3 || New York Rangers || 8–9–4 || 20
|-  style="background:#cfc;"
| 22 || 15 || Pittsburgh Penguins || 5–0 || Toronto Maple Leafs || 9–9–4 || 22
|-  style="background:#ffc;"
| 23 || 19 || Boston Bruins || 3–3 || Pittsburgh Penguins || 9–9–5 || 23
|-  style="background:#cfc;"
| 24 || 20 || Pittsburgh Penguins || 2–0 || Ottawa Senators || 10–9–5 || 25
|-  style="background:#cfc;"
| 25 || 22 || New York Rangers || 3–4 OT || Pittsburgh Penguins || 11–9–5 || 27
|-  style="background:#cfc;"
| 26 || 24 || Buffalo Sabres || 1–5 || Pittsburgh Penguins || 12–9–5 || 29
|-  style="background:#cfc;"
| 27 || 26 || Carolina Hurricanes || 2–3 || Pittsburgh Penguins || 13–9–5 || 31
|-  style="background:#cfc;"
| 28 || 29 || Montreal Canadiens || 3–6 || Pittsburgh Penguins || 14–9–5 || 33
|-

|-  style="background:#cfc;"
| 29 || 1 || Pittsburgh Penguins || 1–0 || Montreal Canadiens || 15–9–5 || 35
|-  style="background:#fcf;"
| 30 || 4 || New Jersey Devils || 4–0 || Pittsburgh Penguins || 15–10–5 || 35
|-  style="background:#cfc;"
| 31 || 6 || Mighty Ducks of Anaheim || 2–5 || Pittsburgh Penguins || 16–10–5 || 37
|-  style="background:#cfc;"
| 32 || 9 || Pittsburgh Penguins || 2–1 || Los Angeles Kings || 17–10–5 || 39
|-  style="background:#cfc;"
| 33 || 10 || Pittsburgh Penguins || 3–0 || Mighty Ducks of Anaheim || 18–10–5 || 41
|-  style="background:#ffc;"
| 34 || 12 || Pittsburgh Penguins || 2–2 || Phoenix Coyotes || 18–10–6 || 42
|-  style="background:#ffc;"
| 35 || 16 || Tampa Bay Lightning || 1–1 || Pittsburgh Penguins || 18–10–7 || 43
|-  style="background:#ffc;"
| 36 || 19 || Pittsburgh Penguins || 3–3 || Colorado Avalanche || 18–10–8 || 44
|-  style="background:#fcf;"
| 37 || 20 || Pittsburgh Penguins || 1–4 || St. Louis Blues || 18–11–8 || 44
|-  style="background:#cfc;"
| 38 || 26 || Pittsburgh Penguins || 4–1 || Washington Capitals || 19–11–8 || 46
|-  style="background:#fcf;"
| 39 || 27 || Montreal Canadiens || 1–0 || Pittsburgh Penguins || 19–12–8 || 46
|-  style="background:#cfc;"
| 40 || 29 || New York Islanders || 1–5 || Pittsburgh Penguins || 20–12–8 || 48
|-  style="background:#cfc;"
| 41 || 31 || Carolina Hurricanes || 2–3 || Pittsburgh Penguins || 21–12–8 || 50
|-

|-  style="background:#fcf;"
| 42 || 3 || Colorado Avalanche || 5–4 OT || Pittsburgh Penguins || 21–13–8 || 50
|-  style="background:#cfc;"
| 43 || 6 || Pittsburgh Penguins || 4–2 || New York Islanders || 22–13–8 || 52
|-  style="background:#fcf;"
| 44 || 7 || Pittsburgh Penguins || 1–3 || New Jersey Devils || 22–14–8 || 52
|-  style="background:#cfc;"
| 45 || 10 || New Jersey Devils || 1–4 || Pittsburgh Penguins || 23–14–8 || 54
|-  style="background:#cfc;"
| 46 || 12 || Pittsburgh Penguins || 4–1 || Carolina Hurricanes || 24–14–8 || 56
|-  style="background:#fcf;"
| 47 || 14 || Pittsburgh Penguins || 2–5 || Boston Bruins || 24–15–8 || 56
|-  style="background:#ffc;"
| 48 || 20 || Ottawa Senators || 0–0 || Pittsburgh Penguins || 24–15–9 || 57
|-  style="background:#cfc;"
| 49 || 22 || Pittsburgh Penguins || 3–2 || New Jersey Devils || 25–15–9 || 59
|-  style="background:#cfc;"
| 50 || 24 || Boston Bruins || 2–4 || Pittsburgh Penguins || 26–15–9 || 61
|-  style="background:#cfc;"
| 51 || 26 || St. Louis Blues || 2–4 || Pittsburgh Penguins || 27–15–9 || 63
|-  style="background:#ffc;"
| 52 || 28 || Pittsburgh Penguins || 2–2 || Washington Capitals || 27–15–10 || 64
|-  style="background:#cfc;"
| 53 || 29 || Pittsburgh Penguins || 4–2 || Boston Bruins || 28–15–10 || 66
|-  style="background:#cfc;"
| 54 || 31 || Detroit Red Wings || 2–4 || Pittsburgh Penguins || 29–15–10 || 68
|-

|-  style="background:#fcf;"
| 55 || 2 || New York Islanders || 4–2 || Pittsburgh Penguins || 29–16–10 || 68
|-  style="background:#ffc;"
| 56 || 4 || Washington Capitals || 2–2 || Pittsburgh Penguins || 29–16–11 || 69
|-  style="background:#ffc;"
| 57 || 6 || Pittsburgh Penguins || 2–2 || Buffalo Sabres || 29–16–12 || 70
|-  style="background:#ffc;"
| 58 || 7 || Pittsburgh Penguins || 2–2 || Ottawa Senators || 29–16–13 || 71
|-  style="background:#cfc;"
| 59 || 25 || Pittsburgh Penguins || 6–2 || Montreal Canadiens || 30–16–13 || 73
|-  style="background:#fcf;"
| 60 || 28 || Pittsburgh Penguins || 2–6 || Boston Bruins || 30–17–13 || 73
|-

|-  style="background:#cfc;"
| 61 || 2 || Toronto Maple Leafs || 1–3 || Pittsburgh Penguins || 31–17–13 || 75
|-  style="background:#ffc;"
| 62 || 5 || Chicago Blackhawks || 2–2 || Pittsburgh Penguins || 31–17–14 || 76
|-  style="background:#cfc;"
| 63 || 7 || Philadelphia Flyers || 4–6 || Pittsburgh Penguins || 32–17–14 || 78
|-  style="background:#fcf;"
| 64 || 8 || Pittsburgh Penguins || 3–4 OT || Philadelphia Flyers || 32–18–14 || 78
|-  style="background:#cfc;"
| 65 || 11 || Calgary Flames || 1–4 || Pittsburgh Penguins || 33–18–14 || 80
|-  style="background:#cfc;"
| 66 || 14 || Buffalo Sabres || 1–2 || Pittsburgh Penguins || 34–18–14 || 82
|-  style="background:#fcf;"
| 67 || 15 || Pittsburgh Penguins || 0–3 || Buffalo Sabres || 34–19–14 || 82
|-  style="background:#cfc;"
| 68 || 18 || Edmonton Oilers || 2–4 || Pittsburgh Penguins || 35–19–14 || 84
|-  style="background:#cfc;"
| 69 || 21 || Philadelphia Flyers || 3–4 || Pittsburgh Penguins || 36–19–14 || 86
|-  style="background:#ffc;"
| 70 || 22 || Pittsburgh Penguins || 0–0 || Dallas Stars || 36–19–15 || 87
|-  style="background:#fcf;"
| 71 || 26 || Pittsburgh Penguins || 3–4 || New York Islanders || 36–20–15 || 87
|-  style="background:#ffc;"
| 72 || 28 || New York Rangers || 2–2 || Pittsburgh Penguins || 36–20–16 || 88
|-  style="background:#ffc;"
| 73 || 29 || Ottawa Senators || 1–1 || Pittsburgh Penguins || 36–20–17 || 89
|-

|-  style="background:#fcf;"
| 74 || 1 || San Jose Sharks || 3–2 || Pittsburgh Penguins || 36–21–17 || 89
|-  style="background:#cfc;"
| 75 || 4 || Pittsburgh Penguins || 4–1 || Tampa Bay Lightning || 37–21–17 || 91
|-  style="background:#fcf;"
| 76 || 5 || Pittsburgh Penguins || 1–3 || Florida Panthers || 37–22–17 || 91
|-  style="background:#fcf;"
| 77 || 7 || Phoenix Coyotes || 2–1 || Pittsburgh Penguins || 37–23–17 || 91
|-  style="background:#fcf;"
| 78 || 9 || Pittsburgh Penguins || 1–4 || Ottawa Senators || 37–24–17 || 91
|-  style="background:#ffc;"
| 79 || 11 || Florida Panthers || 3–3 || Pittsburgh Penguins || 37–24–18 || 92
|-  style="background:#cfc;"
| 80 || 15 || Tampa Bay Lightning || 1–5 || Pittsburgh Penguins || 38–24–18 || 94
|-  style="background:#cfc;"
| 81 || 16 || Pittsburgh Penguins || 4–1 || Carolina Hurricanes || 39–24–18 || 96
|-  style="background:#cfc;"
| 82 || 18 || Boston Bruins || 2–5 || Pittsburgh Penguins || 40–24–18 || 98
|-

|- style="text-align:center;"
| Legend:       = Win       = Loss       = Tie

Playoffs 

|-  style="background:#fcf;"
| 1 || April 23 || Montreal Canadiens || 3–2 (OT) || Pittsburgh Penguins || 0–1
|-  style="background:#cfc;"
| 2 || April 25 || Montreal Canadiens || 1–4 || Pittsburgh Penguins || 1–1
|-  style="background:#fcf;"
| 3 || April 27 || Pittsburgh Penguins || 1–3 || Montreal Canadiens || 1–2
|-  style="background:#cfc;"
| 4 || April 29 || Pittsburgh Penguins || 6–3 || Montreal Canadiens || 2–2
|-  style="background:#fcf;"
| 5 || May 1 || Montreal Canadiens || 5–2 || Pittsburgh Penguins || 2–3
|-  style="background:#fcf;"
| 6 || May 3 || Pittsburgh Penguins || 0–3 || Montreal Canadiens || 2–4
|-

|- style="text-align:center;"
| Legend:       = Win       = Loss

Player statistics 
Skaters

Goaltenders

†Denotes player spent time with another team before joining the Penguins. Stats reflect time with the Penguins only.
‡Denotes player was traded mid-season. Stats reflect time with the Penguins only.

Awards and records

Transactions 
The Penguins have been involved in the following transactions during the 1997–98 season:

Trades

Free agents lost

Claimed via waivers

Lost via waivers

Player signings

Draft picks 

The Penguins drafted the following players at the 1997 NHL Entry Draft at the Civic Arena in Pittsburgh:

Farm teams 
The Johnstown Chiefs of the East Coast Hockey League finished last overall in the Northern Conference with a record of 23–41–6.

The American Hockey League (AHL)'s Syracuse Crunch finished in third place in the Empire State Division with a record of 35–32–11–2 record. They were eliminated by the Hamilton Bulldogs in the first round of the playoffs.

See also 
 1997–98 NHL season

References 
 

P
P
Pittsburgh Penguins seasons
Pitts
Pitts